Pandanus halleorum is a species of plant in the family Pandanaceae. It is endemic to Vanuatu.

References

halleorum
Vulnerable plants
Endemic flora of Vanuatu
Taxonomy articles created by Polbot